Milton José Palacios Suazo (born December 2, 1980) is a retired Honduran footballer who played as a centre-back.

Club career
A tall central defender, Palacios started his career with Olimpia and also played for Victoria. After a 2003 friendly match between Olimpia and Chilean powerhouse Colo-Colo, Iván Zamorano (then a Colo-Colo player) recommended him for the Chilean club; however, both teams failed to reach an agreement despite Colo-Colo having registered the player, and Palacios remained in Olimpia. He joined Marathón in May 2007, but left them in summer 2009 for a short spell at Olimpia only to return to Marathón the same year.
In December 2010 he returned to Victoria.

International career
Palacios made his debut for Honduras in an April 2003 friendly match against Paraguay and has earned a total of 15 caps, scoring no goals. He has represented his country in 2 FIFA World Cup qualification matches and played at the 2003 CONCACAF Gold Cup.

His final international was a September 2006 friendly match against El Salvador.

Personal life
He is a son of Eulogio and Orfilia Palacios and is the oldest of 5 brothers: Johnny, Jerry, Wilson and Edwin René Palacios. On 30 October 2007 Edwin, aged 14, was kidnapped in La Ceiba; he was found murdered one year and seven months later in Omoa.
.

Notes

References

External links

1980 births
Living people
People from La Ceiba
Association football central defenders
Garifuna people
Honduran footballers
Honduras international footballers
2003 CONCACAF Gold Cup players
C.D. Victoria players
C.D. Olimpia players
C.D. Marathón players
Liga Nacional de Fútbol Profesional de Honduras players